Béatrice Mouthon (born 14 June 1966 in Annecy) is an athlete from France, who competes in triathlon.

Mouthon competed at the first Olympic triathlon at the 2000 Summer Olympics.  She took thirty-fifth place with a total time of 2:11:08.08.  Her split times were 21:15.48 for the swim, 1:09:03.90 for the cycling, and 0:40:48.70 for the run.

Her twin sister, Isabelle Mouthon-Michellys, also competed in the 2000 Olympic triathlon.

References
sports-reference

1966 births
Living people
French female triathletes
Triathletes at the 2000 Summer Olympics
Olympic triathletes of France
French twins
Sportspeople from Annecy
Twin sportspeople